Dimitar Veselinov Andonov (born 19 October 1987) is a Bulgarian footballer who currently plays as a midfielder.

References

External links
 
 Profile at Beroe.eu

1987 births
Living people
Bulgarian footballers
First Professional Football League (Bulgaria) players
PFC Beroe Stara Zagora players
OFC Sliven 2000 players
PFC Marek Dupnitsa players
FC Haskovo players
FC Septemvri Sofia players
Association football midfielders
Sportspeople from Haskovo Province